John Forsayeth (15 July 1736 – 17 April 1785) was Archdeacon of Cork  from 1782 until his death.

Forsayeth was born in County Cork and educated at Trinity College, Dublin, where he became a Fellow in 1762 and Professor of Hebrew in 1764.   He served a curacy at St Peter, Cork. After that he held the college living at Rahy and Clondahorky and  the accompanying Prebend at Raphoe Cathedral. In 1782 he became the incumbent at Dunisky.

References

Alumni of Trinity College Dublin
Fellows of Trinity College Dublin
Academics of Trinity College Dublin
Archdeacons of Cork
People from County Cork
1736 births
1785 deaths